The Deed of Death, or known as Geran, is a 2019 Malaysian Malay-language martial arts action film. Showcasing the traditional Malay silat martial art, it tells the story of two siblings in a silat family who has to rescue their younger brother from the criminal gang, and reclaim their family grant stolen.

It is released on 10 October 2019 in Malaysia and Brunei. The film received praise for its fast-paced silat action sequences.

Plot
In a family of practicing silat Gayong, two siblings Ali and Fatimah are frustrated with their reckless younger brother, Mat Arip, as he fails to return home with the grant of their family land. Mat Arip takes part in illegal gambling and racing, and has loaned the land as collateral for his gambling debts to the loan shark criminal Haji Daud. Haji Daud, a long-time enemy of their father, silat coach Pak Nayan, now exact vengeance to the family. The family must fight and race against time to save their brother who is held hostage by the criminal gang and reclaim the family land grant.

Cast
 Namron as Pak Nayan
 Khoharullah as Ali
 Feiyna Tajudin as Fatimah
 Fad Anuar as Mat Arip
 Azlan Komeng as Kahar
 Taiyuddin Bakar as Mi Piang
 Megat Sharizal as Man Bangla
 Aeril Zafrel as Lah 
 Fatimah Abu Bakar 
 Niezam Zaidi as Asan
 Adam Shahz as At
 Kasturi Majid as Tora King
 Sham Majid as Yon
 Yusran Hashim as Chot
 Abinoorizuadin as Pak Teh
 Faizal Hussein as Haji Daud
 Fatimah Abu Bakar as Haryati, narrator

References

External links
Geran on Cinema.com.my
 

Malay-language films
Malaysian martial arts films